Benjamin H. Mooers was a member of the Wisconsin State Assembly during the 1848 session. Mooers represented the 2nd District of Washington County, Wisconsin. He was a Democrat.

References

People from Washington County, Wisconsin
Democratic Party members of the Wisconsin State Assembly
Year of birth missing
Year of death missing